The Paranhana River is a river of Rio Grande do Sul state in southern Brazil.

See also
List of rivers of Rio Grande do Sul

External link
Road map

Rivers of Rio Grande do Sul